The 1938 World Table Tennis Championships mixed doubles was the 12th edition of the mixed doubles championship.  

Laszlo Bellak and Wendy Woodhead defeated Bohumil Váňa and Věra Votrubcová in the final by three sets to two.

Results

See also
List of World Table Tennis Championships medalists

References

-